Moshe Silman (26 November 1954 – 20 July 2012) was an Israeli activist who set himself on fire during a social justice demonstration in protest of Israel's welfare system on 14 July 2012. Silman was burned severely and died of his injuries a week later.

Silman's self-immolation was widely covered in the Israeli and international media and was followed by wide public and political discourse within the Israeli society.

Background 
Moshe Silman was born in 1954. He was never married and he had no children. He spent several years in the United States, and  he established the trucking business "Mika Transportation" when he returned to Israel. The company's operations centered on four trucks.

In 2002 Silman was charged by the National Insurance Institute of Israel to pay 15,000 NIS. He did not pay the sum due to a dispute regarding the justification of the billing, so one of his trucks was confiscated by the National Insurance Institute. The truck was sold a year later, after Silman did not pay his debt to the National Insurance Institute. As a result, Silman filed a tort claim against the National Insurance Institute, claiming that the institute caused him damages of more than 4.5 million and a foreclosure due to the confiscation of his truck. Silman asked the court to exempt him from paying for the legal procedure but he was refused, after the court's registrar held that "the amount of the claim is absurd, and so is the attempt to link the failures of the National Insurance Institute to the damage caused to applicant." Later on, Silman filed an appeal against the decision to the Supreme Court, but it was refused by the court's registrar on the grounds that Silman must appeal to the district court.

In 2004 Silman established a company which manufactured plastic planters. This project evidently failed, and Silman demanded compensation from the company's suppliers, but his claim was rejected.  The judge criticized Silman by stating: "The data of this case indicates that this is not a dream we are dealing with but probably a fantasy, and that it is a pity that Silman choose to turn against all the parties whom tried to help him as much as possible in this project, without being paid for their work."

Following the collapse of his businesses, Silman moved in with his mother in Bat Yam in 2005; he worked as a taxi driver. After his mother's death, and after her apartment was confiscated by the authorities, Silman began renting his own apartment. He later moved to Haifa, where he rented an apartment. Since his driver's license was suspended due to medical reasons, he was no longer able to make a living as a taxi driver. He turned to the National Insurance Institute to recognize his disability, but received lower disability rates. After the intervention of the Rabbis for Human Rights, in May 2012 he was recognized by the National Insurance Institute as being 100% disabled and began receiving from the institute disability payments of 2,300 NIS per month.

His appeals to the Ministry of Housing and Construction for assistance in rent were rejected because he did not meet the criteria necessary for that assistance. In addition, Silman turned to the Israeli state-owned housing company Amidar and requested public housing, but his request was eventually rejected because he did not meet the criteria necessary for that assistance. His appeal to the Department of Social Affairs of the Municipality of Haifa was also rejected, and he was told by the municipality that they could only help him after he ended up in the streets.

MK Orly Levy-Abekasis, chairman of the Lobby for public housing, approached the CEO of the Ministry of Housing, on behalf of Silman. Nevertheless, her appeals were also rejected. The Ministry of Housing said that a special committee would discuss his request again in September, but it declined to provide emergency assistance to prevent him from becoming homeless.

All along Silman made it clear that he would not end up in the streets. Silman insisted that, after fulfilling his national duties via his mandatory military service and Reserves service, the state of Israel was obligated to help law-abiding citizens in such dire economic and health situations. In the past, Silman did threaten to harm himself, but his threats did not lead the welfare authorities to solve his problems. In response to his threats, the psychiatric commission representative of the National Insurance Institute claimed that those who threaten to commit suicide do not intend to commit suicide, and the Amidar clerk asked him to just not do it at the Amidar offices.

Social justice activities
During the summer of 2011, Silman joined the activities of Israeli social justice protests in the Haifa region. Silman advocated taking a more political and active approach, in contrast to those whom sought to focus the social justice protests only on a change of consciousness within the existing framework. He claimed that the protests must be political, and that this should be reflected in an establishment of a party which would manage to overthrow the government of Benjamin Netanyahu. Silman called for active operations, such as occupying abandoned or unoccupied empty residential apartments as part of the struggle for public housing.

Self-immolation 

Silman set himself on fire during a social justice demonstration held on 14 July 2012. In the suicide letter he passed out before he burnt himself, he accused the state of Israel and the welfare system of failing to treat disadvantaged people in his situation. He blamed Prime Minister Benjamin Netanyahu and the Finance Minister Yuval Steinitz for the economic policy that led him to commit suicide: "I hold the State of Israel, Bibi Netanyahu and Steinitz, the bastards, accountable for the humiliation which the disadvantaged citizens, go through every day, as the rich and the government workers take from the poor." He also blamed various government officials in National Insurance Institute, including the Claims Department Manager and the Registrar of the court in Haifa, for the injustice done to him.

Silman was transferred to the Tel Aviv Sourasky Medical Center, which was the closest to the site in which the self-immolation occurred. This hospital did not include a burn unit, so he was transferred to the Sheba Medical Center. Even once he arrived there, all six beds in the burn unit were occupied and he had to be treated in the general intensive care unit of the hospital.

Moshe Silman died of his injuries on 20 July 2012. He was buried in the Beit kVarot ha-Darom Cemetery in Holon.

Aftermath 
Prime Minister Benjamin Netanyahu referred to the event as a "great personal tragedy". Israeli Minister of Education Gideon Sa'ar stated that "the act should remind us all of the everyday hardships of our society and of our individuals, and that we must be sensitive and responsive to the plight of others and assist as much as possible. The important thing is to understand the background of things, to understand the distress from which events such as this could derive and to be sensitive to it."

MK Shelly Yachimovich stated that "suicide is an unusual and shocking answer to difficulties and suffering, but we must not forget the context: the inhumane hardening of the conditions of eligibility for public housing, the unraveling of the social safety net until it has holes so huge that many fall through them to the abyss; and the struggle for survival of small and medium business owners. Silman's fate occurred largely due to the collapse of the welfare state, and the rise of a Darwinian jungle economy."

In the Israeli public discourse, some have compared Moshe Silman to Jan Palach or Mohamed Bouazizi; they see the state leaders (and Benjamin Netanyahu in particular) as responsible for Silman's condition. Others perceive Silman as a person suffering from a mental illness which, in his unfortunate life circumstances, led to a desperate act.

Silman's self-immolation act led to a Werther effect, as a number of other Israelis attempted to commit suicide due to financial distress and emotional despair over the Israeli welfare system. Akiva Mafai, a 45-year-old IDF veteran and wheelchair user, set himself on fire at a bus station and died of his wounds only two days after the death of Silman. On 11 December 2013 a memorial event was held for six people who had self-immolated in the past year.

The Israeli government established an emergency treatment for extreme cases. Social workers complained that they do not have the tools to deal with the distress of many people beset by the housing shortages and failures of the National Insurance Institute; this may lead to an increase in suicide attempts after the affected realize that social workers cannot help them.

See also 
 List of political self-immolations

References

External links 
 Israeli Protester Dies After Self-Immolation – published in The New York Times on July 20, 2012
 Israel's New Protest Movement: Suicide by Fire – published on newser.com on July 29, 2012

2012 in Israel
Suicides in Israel
1954 births
2012 suicides
Israeli activists
Israeli taxi drivers
Suicides by self-immolation